The CDMX Open was a professional tennis tournament played on clay courts. It was part of the ATP Challenger Tour. It was held in Mexico City, Mexico in 2018.

Past finals

Singles

Doubles

References

ATP Challenger Tour
Clay court tennis tournaments
Tennis tournaments in Mexico